Toudao Street Station is a station on Line 1 of Wuhan Metro, opened upon completion of Line 1, Phase 2 on July 29, 2010.  It is an elevated station located on Jiefang Avenue, close to Second Wuhan Yangtze River Bridge. There are two side platforms and two tracks at Toudao Street Station. A prefabricated bridge was installed south of the station to pass over railroad traffic at the Jiang'an Rail Yard, a freight yard which has since been demolished and redeveloped.

Station layout

Facilities
Toudao Street Station is a three-story elevated station built entirely along Jiefang Avenue. The station is equipped with attended customer service concierges, automatic ticket vending machines, accessible lifts, and restrooms in the non-fared zone.

Exits
There are currently three exits (A, B and C) in service, all of which are accessible to Jiefang Avenue.

Transfers
Bus transfers to Route 4, 212, 313, 346, 408, 508, 509, 551, 577, 582, 583, 622, 707, 727, 793 and Trolleybus Route 3 are available at Toudao Street Station.

References

Wuhan Metro stations
Line 1, Wuhan Metro
Railway stations in China opened in 2010